This is a list of beaches in San Diego County, located in Southern California in the United States. The beaches are listed in order from north to south, and they are grouped (where applicable) by the community in which the beach is situated.

Some beaches in the San Diego area are long continuous stretches of sandy coastline, others, like many of the beaches in the Village of La Jolla (which was built on a large rocky promontory), are small sand beaches within rocky coves or between rocky points. A number of beaches in the San Diego area have cliffs behind them, usually composed of rather soft sandstone; some other beaches front freshwater lagoons where rivers run into the coast.

Beaches in North County

This list of beaches in San Diego's North County is arranged from north to south; the beaches are grouped by the communities in which they occur. Although in some areas there may be a continuous long stretch of sand along several miles of coastline, especially so during low tides, nonetheless there may be different beach names at different locations, according to where the beach is accessed.

 San Onofre State Beach
 Upper Trestles
 Trestles
 Lower Trestles, Church
 Old Man's
 Trails
 Camp Pendleton a.k.a. Marine Corps Base Camp Pendleton, has 17 miles (27 km) of coastline
Del Mar Beach Resort at Camp Pendleton—must have base access 
 Oceanside:
Harbor Beach
Buccaneer
South Oceanside
Oceanside
 Saint Malo Beach
 Carlsbad:
 North Carlsbad beaches
 Carlsbad City Beach
 Tamarak Surf Beach
 Carlsbad State Beach
 Terra Mar Point
 South Carlsbad State Beach
 Ponto Beach
 Leucadia:
 Grandview Beach
 Beacons Beach, a.k.a. Leucadia State Beach
 Stone Steps
 Encinitas:
 Moonlight State Beach
 D Street Beach, a.k.a. Boneyard Beach
 Swami's Beach
 Cardiff:
Pipes
San Elijo State Beach
Cardiff Reef
George's
Cardiff State Beach
Seaside
Tabletop
 Solana Beach:
Tide Park
Fletcher Cove Park, a.k.a. Pillbox
Seascape Surf, a.k.a. Seascape Beach
Del Mar Shores
 Del Mar:
Dog Beach, a.k.a. The River Mouth
Del Mar City Beach
Powerhouse Park

Beaches in the city of San Diego

These beaches are within the city limits of San Diego. The beaches are listed from north to south and are grouped by the name of the community in which they are situated. Note that names such as "Pacific Beach" and "Ocean Beach" refer to the name of communities, as well as being the names of the beaches situated within those communities.

Torrey Pines State Beach
La Jolla:
 Torrey Pines City Beach
Black's Beach
La Jolla Shores
La Jolla Cove
Boomer Beach
Shell Beach
Children's Pool Beach a.k.a. Casa Beach
Wipeout Beach
Hospitals Beach
Whispering Sands Beach, a.k.a. Horseshoes
Marine Street Beach
Windansea
Pacific Beach:
Tourmaline Surf Park
North Pacific Beach
Pacific Beach
Mission Beach:
Mission Beach
Mission Bay and Beaches - beaches in the Bay
South Mission Beach
Ocean Beach:
 Dog Beach
 Ocean Beach City Beach beach and fishing pier
Sunset Cliffs
 Sunset Cliffs
Point Loma:
Cabrillo National Monument - access to tidepools

Beaches in Coronado and South Bay
These beaches stretch from the mouth of San Diego Bay to the border with Tijuana, Mexico in the south.
Coronado:
Coronado Central Beach
North Beach
Glorietta Bay
Silver Strand State Beach
Ferry Landing Marketplace
Imperial Beach:
Imperial Beach, the pier
Border Field State Park - not always open, water not safe to swim in

See also
 List of beaches in California

References

External links

 Beach highlights
SanDiego.gov: Beaches
San Diego Beaches
SanDiego.org: Beach Guide
 Automobile Association of America, Automobile Club of Southern California, Map of San Diego North, 2007 to 2010
 AAA Map San Diego Region, 2013

Beaches
Beaches in San Diego
California, San Diego
Beaches
San Diego
Beaches, San Diego
Pacific Ocean-related lists